Krzysztof Janus (born 25 March 1986) is a Polish professional footballer who plays as a winger for Wisła Płock II.

Career

Club
In July 2011, he was loaned to KS Polkowice on a one-year deal. After that, he played for Wisła Płock.

References

External links
 
 

1986 births
Living people
People from Brzeg Dolny
GKS Bełchatów players
Polish footballers
MKS Cracovia (football) players
Górnik Polkowice players
Wisła Płock players
Zagłębie Lubin players
Arka Gdynia players
Odra Opole players
Ekstraklasa players
I liga players
II liga players
III liga players
Sportspeople from Lower Silesian Voivodeship
Association football midfielders